Morocco competed at the 1968 Summer Olympics in Mexico City, Mexico.

References
Official Olympic Reports

Nations at the 1968 Summer Olympics
1968
1968 in Moroccan sport